Poowong is a small dairying town located in South Gippsland, in the Australian state of Victoria.

History
The first application for land in the Parish of Poowong was made on 17 April 1874 by James Scott for 320 acres of allotment 5, the selection made on behalf on his son Robert Scott. Four more selectors pegged out allotments within the next twelve months. On part of the Scott land a store, pub and butcher's shop were built. The Poowong Hotel was built by 1880 but it was destroyed by fire in 1883.

A Post Office opened around January 1878. The first survey of townships allotments took place in 1879.

The heavily timbered and hilly nature of the area meant selectors took years to clear enough of their land to make a living from their selections.

Facilities
For a town of its size, Poowong is quite well off with regard to its facilities. These include four tennis courts, two netball courts, an indoor basketball and squash stadium, a primary school, large community hall, outdoor swimming pool, a number of churches and an Australian rules football oval. The town has an Australian Rules football team and a netball team competing in the Ellinbank & District Football League and the Ellinbank & District Netball Association respectively.

Community projects 
The Poowong community is active, with many projects being undertaken by various community groups. The largest group, by far, is the Poowong Football & Netball Club who involve themselves not only in sporting projects, but also in projects helping the wider community.
One such project is the 'My Connected Community' project which was being run by the Poowong Football Club in a partnership with the Strzelecki Lions Club, and was designed to increase Internet use amongst community members.

Notable people from Poowong
 Wilfred Burchett – war correspondent
 Albert Francis Ronalds - prominent civil engineer
 Don Watson – writer and historian
 Rudi Mandemaker – full forward representing South Australia in interstate Australian Rules football who also won the Mark of the Year (SANFL) in 1989
 Jai Newcombe, AFL footballer for the Hawthorn Football Club

References 

Towns in Victoria (Australia)
Shire of South Gippsland